The Goulburn Valley's 95.3 Triple M is a commercial radio station broadcasting from Shepparton, Victoria, Australia. It is currently owned by Southern Cross Austereo & broadcasts an Adult Contemporary (AC) format. It features both locally produced content & nationally syndicated content. They have a repeater at Mansfield (91.3FM). It was previously known as '3SR FM' until it was rebranded as Triple M in December 2016, alongside many other Southern Cross Austereo stations. It is a part of the Triple M - Greatest Hits network.

History
The Goulburn Valley's 95.3 Triple M began life as 3WR, Wangaratta, first broadcasting on 1 December 1924.  Its initial owner was the Wangaratta Sports Depot.  3WR was Australia's first non-capital city radio station.  However, it closed as early as 22 December 1925, only to reopen under new management on 5 January 1931.  3WR moved its studios, transmitter and offices from Wangaratta to Shepparton on 15 January 1935.  The name was changed to 3SR in January 1936. Unlike other stations, 3SR, from which 3SR FM derives its name, did not convert to the FM band. Instead, the original station was sold in return for a separate FM licence. Today, 3SR broadcasts as a relay of Melbourne horse racing station RSN Racing & Sport.

References

Radio stations in Victoria
Radio stations established in 1998
Adult contemporary radio stations in Australia